During World War II, the Waffen-SS recruited significant numbers of non-Germans, both as volunteers and conscripts. In total some 500,000 non-Germans and ethnic Germans from outside Germany, mostly from German-occupied Europe, were recruited between 1940 and 1945. The units were under the control of the SS Führungshauptamt (SS Command Main Office) beneath Reichsführer-SS Heinrich Himmler. Upon mobilization, the units' tactical control was given to the Oberkommando der Wehrmacht (High Command of the Armed Forces).

History of the Waffen-SS

The Waffen-SS (Armed SS) was created as the militarized wing of the Schutzstaffel (SS; "Protective Squadron") of the Nazi Party. Its origins can be traced back to the selection of a group of 120 SS men in 1933 by Sepp Dietrich to form the Sonderkommando Berlin, which became the Leibstandarte SS Adolf Hitler (LSSAH). In 1934, the SS developed its own military branch, the SS-Verfügungstruppe (SS-VT), which together with the LSSAH, evolved into the Waffen-SS.  Nominally under the authority of Heinrich Himmler, the Waffen-SS developed a fully militarised structure of command and operations. It grew from three regiments to over 38 divisions during World War II, serving alongside the Heer (army), while never formally being a part of it. It was Hitler's wish that the Waffen-SS should not be integrated into either the army or the state police, instead it would remain an independent force of military-trained men at the disposal of the Führer.

Recruitment and conscription
In 1934, Himmler initially set stringent requirements for recruits. They were to be German nationals who could prove their Aryan ancestry back to 1800, unmarried, and without a criminal record. Recruits were required to have perfect teeth and eyesight and provide a medical certificate. By 1938, the height restrictions were relaxed, up to six dental fillings were permitted, and eyeglasses for astigmatism and mild vision correction were allowed. Once World War II commenced in Europe, the physical requirements were no longer strictly enforced. Following the campaign in the West in 1940, Hitler authorized the enlistment of "people perceived to be of related stock", as Himmler put it, to expand the ranks. A number of Danes, Dutch, Norwegians, Swedes and Finns volunteered to serve in the Waffen-SS under the command of German officers. Non-Germanic units were not considered to be part of the SS directly, which still maintained its strict racial criteria; instead they were considered to be foreign nationals serving under the command of the SS.

Not all members of the SS-Germanischen Leitstelle (SS-GL) or the RHSA stressed the nationalistic tenets of the Nazi state with respect to the war and occupation but instead looked to pan-Germanic ideas that included disempowering the political elites, while at the same time, integrating Germanic elements from other nations into the Reich on the basis of racial equality. One of the leaders of the SS-GL, Dr. Franz Riedweg (an SS-Colonel), unambiguously emphasized:
"We must be clear about the fact that Germanic politics can only be resolved under the SS, not by the state, not by the bulk of the party!...We cannot build Europe as a police state under the protection of bayonets, but must shape the life of Europe according to greater Germanic viewpoints."

Recruitment began in April 1940 with the creation of two regiments: Nordland (later SS Division Nordland)  and Westland (later SS Division Wiking). As they grew in numbers, the volunteers were grouped into Legions (with the size of battalion or brigade); their members included the so-called Germanic non-Germans as well as ethnic German officers originating from the occupied territories. Against the Führer's wishes—who forbade using military units of so-called "racially inferior" persons—the SS added foreign recruits and used them to flexibly overcome manpower shortages. Some of these foreign Waffen-SS units were employed for security purposes, among other things. 

After Germany invaded the Soviet Union during Operation Barbarossa, recruits from France, Spain, Belgium (including Walloons), the territory of occupied Czechoslovakia, Hungary and the Balkans were signed on. By February 1942, Waffen-SS recruitment in south-east Europe turned into compulsory conscription for all German minorities of military age. From 1942 onwards, further units of non-Germanic recruits were formed. Legions were formed of men from Estonia, Latvia as well as men from Bosnia, Herzegovina, Croatia, Georgia, Ukraine, Russia and Cossacks. However, by 1943 the Waffen-SS could no longer claim overall to be an "elite" fighting force. Recruitment and conscription based on "numerical over qualitative expansion" took place, with many of the "foreign" units being good for only rear-guard duty.

A system of nomenclature developed to formally distinguish personnel based on their place of origin. Germanic units would have the "SS" prefix, while non-Germanic units were designated with the "Waffen" prefix to their names. The formations with volunteers of Germanic background were officially named Freiwilligen (volunteer) (Scandinavians, Dutch, and Flemish), including ethnic Germans born outside the Reich known as Volksdeutsche, and their members were from satellite countries. These were organized into independent legions and had the designation Waffen attached to their names for formal identification. In addition, the German SS Division Wiking included recruits from Denmark, Norway, Finland,  Sweden, and Estonia throughout its history. Despite manpower shortages, the Waffen-SS was still based on the racist ideology of Nazism, thereby ethnic Poles were specifically regarded as "second-class people" and the Poles were the only ethnic group from whom neither voluntary SS units nor uniformed auxiliary police were ever created. Early in 1943, the Waffen-SS accepted 12,643 of the 53,000 recruits it garnered in western Ukraine and by 1944 the number reached as high as 22,000.

Recruitment efforts in 1943 in Estonia yielded about 5,000 soldiers for the 20th Estonian Waffen-SS division. In Latvia, however, the Nazis were more successful, as, by 1944, there were upwards of 100,000 soldiers serving in the Latvian Waffen-SS divisions. Before the war's end, the foreigners who served in the Waffen-SS numbered "some 500,000", including those who were pressured into service or conscripted. Historian Martin Gutmann adds that some of the additional forces came from "Eastern and Southeastern Europe, including Muslim soldiers from the Balkans."

Post-war 

During the Nuremberg Trials, the Waffen-SS was declared a criminal organization for its major involvement in war crimes and for being an "integral part" of the SS. Conscripts who were not given a choice as to joining the ranks and had not committed "such crimes" were determined to be exempt from this declaration.

Belgian collaborator Léon Degrelle escaped to Spain, despite being sentenced to death in absentia by the Belgian authorities. About 150 Baltic soldiers from Latvia, Lithuania and Estonia who fought against Soviets and escaped to Sweden were extradited to the Soviet Union in 1946.

The men of the XV SS Cossack Corps found themselves in Austria at the end of the war and surrendered to British troops. Though they were given assurances that they would not be repatriated, the Cossack prisoners of war were nonetheless forcibly returned to the Soviet Union. Most along with their families were executed for treason.

After the war, members of Baltic Waffen-Grenadier Units were considered separate and distinct in purpose, ideology and activities from the German SS by the Western Allies. During the 1946 Nuremberg trials, Estonians, Latvians, and Lithuanians who were drafted into the Waffen-SS, were determined not to be criminals for having been "wedged between, and subject to, the dictates of two authoritarian regimes."

Amid the 11,000 Ukrainian members of the former SS Galizien, who had fled westwards to surrender—replete in their German SS uniforms—to the British in Italy, only 3,000 of them were repatriated to the Soviet Union. The rest remained temporarily lodged at Rimini as displaced persons, many of whom became British or Canadian citizens as a result of Cold War expediency.

Foreign Waffen-SS units recruited by Nazi Germany

Albania
Total: 6,500 to 8,000
 21st Waffen Mountain Division of the SS Skanderbeg 7,000
 Police Self-Defense Regiment Sandschak

Belgium
Total: 18,000 (about "evenly divided between Flemings and Walloons")
 SS-Freiwilligen Legion Flandern (1941): 875
 SS-Freiwilligen-Standarte Nordwest
 5th SS Volunteer Sturmbrigade Wallonien
 6th SS Volunteer Sturmbrigade Langemarck
 27th SS Volunteer Grenadier Division Langemarck (Flämische no. 1)
 28th SS Volunteer Grenadier Division Wallonien (Walloon no. 1)
 Flemish volunteers in the 5th SS division Wiking

Bulgaria
Total: 700
 Waffen Grenadier Regiment of the SS (1st Bulgarian)
 Bulgarian volunteers in the SS-Jagdverband Südost.

Bohemia and Moravia
Total: 77. Created after half of March 1945, never saw combat.
St. Wenceslas Company

Croatia
 German-Croatian SS Police and Gendarmerie
 13th Waffen Mountain Division of the SS Handschar (1st Croatian)
 23rd Waffen Mountain Division of the SS Kama (2nd Croatian)
 7th SS Volunteer Mountain Division Prinz Eugen
IX Waffen Mountain Corps of the SS (Croatian)

Denmark
Total: 6,000
Free Corps Denmark (1941): 1,164
Danish volunteers in the Waffen-SS, the majority of them in the SS Division Wiking and the SS Division Nordland

Estonia
Total: 20,000 officially entered in the Waffen SS
Estonian Legion
20th Waffen Grenadier Division of the SS (1st Estonian)
3rd Estonian SS Volunteer Brigade

Finland
Total: 1,180 to 3,000
Finnish Volunteer Battalion of the Waffen-SS
Finnish SS-Company

France
Total: 9,000
SS Volunteer Sturmbrigade France 1,688 (30 June 1944)
33rd Waffen Grenadier Division of the SS Charlemagne (1st French) 7,340
Bretonische Waffenverband der SS (80 men)

Hungary
Total: 20,000
SS-Regimentsgruppe Ney 3,100
1st Hungarian SS-Ski Battalion
22nd SS Volunteer Cavalry Division Maria Theresia
25th Waffen Grenadier Division of the SS Hunyadi (1st Hungarian)
26th Waffen Grenadier Division of the SS (2nd Hungarian)
33rd Waffen Cavalry Division of the SS (3rd Hungarian)

India
Total: 4,500
Indian Volunteer Legion of the Waffen SS (from 1944)

Italy
Total: 15,000
Italienische Freiwilligen Legion
1st Sturmbrigade, Italienische Freiwilligen Legion
24th Waffen Mountain Division of the SS
29th Waffen Grenadier Division of the SS (1st Italian)

Latvia
Total: 60,000 to 80,000 
VI SS Army Corps (Latvian)
Latvian Legion
15th Waffen Grenadier Division of the SS (1st Latvian)
19th Waffen Grenadier Division of the SS (2nd Latvian)

The Netherlands
Total: 20,000 to 25,000
SS Freiwilligen Legion Niederlande (1941): 2,559
SS-Freiwilligen-Standarte Nordwest
SS Volunteer Grenadier-Brigade Landstorm Nederland
4th SS Volunteer Panzergrenadier Brigade Nederland
5th SS Volunteer Wiking division standarte "Westland" 
23rd SS Volunteer Panzer Grenadier Division Nederland
34th SS Volunteer Grenadier Division Landstorm Nederland

Norway
Total: 6,000 
SS Freiwilligen Legion Norwegen (1941): 1,218
SS-Schijager-Batalljon Norwegen
SS-Volunteer-Panzer-Grenadier Regiment 23 "Norge" (as part of SS Division Nordland
Norwegian volunteers in the 5th SS Panzer Division Wiking

Romania
Total: 250,000–300,000 
Romanian volunteers in the Waffen-SS
 Waffen Grenadier Regiment of the SS (1st Romanian)
 Waffen Grenadier Regiment of the SS (2nd Romanian)

Serbia
 Serbian Volunteer Corps (absorbed in 1944)

Spain
Total: 300
Spanische-Freiwilligen-Kompanie der SS 101: 240
Spanische-Freiwilligen-Kompanie der SS 102

Soviet Union (Russia)
29th Waffen Grenadier Division of the SS RONA (1st Russian)
30th Waffen Grenadier Division of the SS (1st Belarussian)
Osttürkische Waffen-Verbände der SS
Kaukasische Waffen-Verbände der SS
Kaminski Brigade, also known as Waffen-Sturm-Brigade RONA
Tataren-Gebirgsjäger-Regiment der SS
Waffen-Gebirgs-Brigade der SS (tatarische Nr. 1)
Waffen-Grenadier-Brigade der SS (weißruthenische Nr. 1)

Sweden
 Waffen-SS Abteilung Sveaborg. 
 Historians estimate between 100 and 300 Swedish volunteers joined SS units, including the 5th SS Division Wiking, and the III Germanisches Panzer Korps, among others.

Switzerland
In total, approximately 1,300 Swiss volunteers joined the SS.

Ukraine
Total: 20,000
14th Waffen Grenadier Division of the SS (1st Galician)
Ukrainian volunteers in the 30th Waffen Grenadier Division of the SS 
Ukrainian volunteers in the Dirlewanger Brigade.

United Kingdom
Total: 54
British Free Corps of the Waffen-SS

Iceland
Total: 20–40

Approximately about 20 to 40 Icelanders served in the Waffen SS, including Sveinn Björnsson's son, Björn Sveinsson Björnsson. Most of Icelandic volenteers fought in the 5th SS-Panzer-Division Wiking, or in the SS Nordland

See also

 List of Waffen-SS units
 Wehrmacht foreign volunteers and conscripts
 Waffen-SS in popular culture
 Non-Germans in the German armed forces during World War II

References

Notes

Citations

Bibliography

Further reading

External links
 SS veterans in Britain hold secret reunions: The Telegraph, 5 May 2002.

 
 
 
Expatriate military units and formations